Dobroslav "Toro" Ćulafić (17 January 1926 – 3 June 2011) was a Yugoslav politician from Montenegro who served as Secretary of the Interior of SFR Yugoslavia from 1984 to 1989.

Educated in Belgrade and later a partisan fighter in World War II, Ćulafić became an active member of the League of Communists of Yugoslavia after he joined in 1943. He served in a number of government positions before the collapse of Yugoslavia in the early 1990s.

See also
League of Communists of Montenegro
Ministry of the Interior (Yugoslavia)

References

1926 births
2011 deaths
League of Communists of Montenegro politicians
Presidency of the Socialist Federal Republic of Yugoslavia members